First Prize is an album by pianist and composer George Gruntz's Concert Jazz Band, which was recorded in Switzerland in 1989 and released onEnja Records.

Reception

The Allmusic review by Scott Yanow stated "This is a particularly fun outing ... both complex and full of wit and color. ... there is plenty of variety and many brilliant moments. George Gruntz's 18-piece group was one of the finest of the period, and this sometimes-eccentric CD is a perfect introduction to his music".

Track listing
All compositions by George Gruntz except where noted
 "So Easy" (Larry Schneider) – 8:09
 "Gorby-Chief" – 11:25
 "Speaking of Love" – 7:47
 "Trance-Figurations" (Franco Ambrosetti) – 5:42
 "Amnesty" – 8:08
 "E.B.S.B.M.O." (Kenny Wheeler) – 9:18
 "Band Switch" – 7:18
 "Fishin' With Gramps" (Ray Anderson) – 5:16

Personnel
George Gruntz – piano, arranger
Franco Ambrosetti – trumpet, flugelhorn
Stanton Davis – trumpet, flugelhorn
Mike Mossman – trumpet, flugelhorn 
Manfred Schoof – trumpet, flugelhorn
Marvin Stamm – trumpet, flugelhorn
Sharon Freeman – French horn
Tom Varner – French horn
David Bargeron – euphonium
Joe Daley – euphonium
Howard Johnson – tuba, bass clarinet
Chris Hunter – flute, soprano saxophone, alto saxophone
Ernst-Ludwig Petrowski – flute, clarinet, soprano saxophone, alto saxophone 
Bob Malach – flute, soprano saxophone, tenor saxophone
Larry Schneider – soprano saxophone, tenor saxophone
Vinny Golia – baritone saxophone, bass flute
Mike Richmond – bass
Adam Nussbaum – drums

References

George Gruntz albums
1989 albums
Enja Records albums